The TOP500 project ranks and details the 500 most powerful non-distributed computer systems in the world. The project was started in 1993 and publishes an updated list of the supercomputers twice a year. The first of these updates always coincides with the International Supercomputing Conference in June, and the second is presented at the ACM/IEEE Supercomputing Conference in November. The project aims to provide a reliable basis for tracking and detecting trends in high-performance computing and bases rankings on HPL, a portable implementation of the high-performance LINPACK benchmark written in Fortran for distributed-memory computers.

The 60th TOP500 was published in November 2022. Since June 2022, USA's Frontier is the most powerful supercomputer on TOP500, reaching 1102 petaFlops (1.102 exaFlops) on the LINPACK benchmarks. The United States has by far the highest share of total computing power on the list (nearly 50%), while China currently leads the list in number of systems with 173 supercomputers, with the USA not far behind in second place. 

The TOP500 list is compiled by Jack Dongarra of the University of Tennessee, Knoxville, Erich Strohmaier and Horst Simon of the National Energy Research Scientific Computing Center (NERSC) and Lawrence Berkeley National Laboratory (LBNL), and, until his death in 2014, Hans Meuer of the University of Mannheim, Germany.

The TOP500 project also includes lists such as Green500 (measuring energy efficiency) and HPCG (measuring I/O bandwidth).

History 

In the early 1990s, a new definition of supercomputer was needed to produce meaningful statistics. After experimenting with metrics based on processor count in 1992, the idea arose at the University of Mannheim to use a detailed listing of installed systems as the basis. In early 1993, Jack Dongarra was persuaded to join the project with his LINPACK benchmarks. A first test version was produced in May 1993, partly based on data available on the Internet, including the following sources:
 "List of the World's Most Powerful Computing Sites" maintained by Gunter Ahrendt
 David Kahaner, the director of the Asian Technology Information Program (ATIP); published a report in 1992, titled "Kahaner Report on Supercomputer in Japan" which had an immense amount of data.

The information from those sources was used for the first two lists. Since June 1993, the TOP500 is produced bi-annually based on site and vendor submissions only.

Since 1993, performance of the  ranked position has grown steadily in accordance with Moore's law, doubling roughly every 14 months. In June 2018, Summit was fastest with an Rpeak of 187.6593 PFLOPS. For comparison, this is over 1,432,513 times faster than the Connection Machine CM-5/1024 (1,024 cores), which was the fastest system in November 1993 (twenty-five years prior) with an Rpeak of 131.0 GFLOPS.

Architecture and operating systems 

, all supercomputers on TOP500 are 64-bit, mostly based on CPUs using the x86-64 instruction set architecture (of which  384 are Intel EMT64-based and  101 are AMD AMD64-based, including the top 1 and most systems on top 10, with only one Intel-based on top 10, the 9th). The few exceptions are all based on RISC architectures. Six  supercomputers are based on ARM64, seven are based on the Power ISA  used by IBM Power microprocessors, no longer any SPARC-based, but previously the list had three supercomputers based on Fujitsu-designed SPARC64  chips. One computer uses another non-US design, the Japanese PEZY-SC (based, in part, on the British  32-bit ARM) as an accelerator paired with Intel's Xeon.

In recent years heterogeneous computing, mostly using Nvidia's graphics processing units (GPUs) or Intel's x86-based Xeon Phi as coprocessors, has dominated the TOP500 because of better performance per watt ratios and higher absolute performance, while AMD GPUs have taken the top 1 and displaced Nvidia in top 10 part of the list. The recent exceptions include the aforementioned Fugaku, Sunway TaihuLight, and K computer. Tianhe-2A is also an interesting exception, as US sanctions prevented use of Xeon Phi; instead, it was upgraded to use the Chinese-designed Matrix-2000 accelerators.

Two computers which first appeared on the list in 2018 are based on architectures new to the TOP500. One was a new x86-64 microarchitecture from Chinese manufacturer Sugon, using Hygon Dhyana CPUs (these resulted from a collaboration with AMD, and are a minor variant of Zen-based AMD EPYC) and was ranked 38th, now 117th, and the other was the first ARM-based computer on the list using Cavium ThunderX2 CPUs. Before the ascendancy of 32-bit x86 and later 64-bit x86-64 in the early 2000s, a variety of RISC processor families made up most TOP500 supercomputers, including SPARC, MIPS, PA-RISC, and Alpha.

All the fastest supercomputers since the Earth Simulator supercomputer have used operating systems based on Linux. , all the listed supercomputers use an operating system based on the Linux kernel.

Since November 2015, no computer on the list runs Windows (while Microsoft reappeared on the list in 2021 with Ubuntu based on Linux). In November 2014, Windows Azure cloud computer was no longer on the list of fastest supercomputers (its best rank was 165th in 2012), leaving the Shanghai Supercomputer Center's Magic Cube as the only Windows-based supercomputer on the list, until it also dropped off the list. It was ranked 436th in its last appearance on the list released in June 2015, while its best rank was 11th in 2008. There are no longer any Mac OS computers on the list. It had at most five such systems at a time, one more than the Windows systems that came later, while the total performance share for Windows was higher. Their relative performance share of the whole list was however similar, and never high for either. In 2004 System X supercomputer based on Mac OS X (Xserve, with 2,200 PowerPC 970 processors) once ranked 7th place.

It has been well over a decade since MIPS systems dropped entirely off the list though the Gyoukou supercomputer that jumped to 4th place in November 2017 had a MIPS-based design as a small part of the coprocessors. Use of 2,048-core coprocessors (plus 8× 6-core MIPS, for each, that "no longer require to rely on an external Intel Xeon E5 host processor") made the supercomputer much more energy efficient than the other top 10 (i.e. it was 5th on Green500 and other such ZettaScaler-2.2-based systems take first three spots). At 19.86 million cores, it was by far the largest system by core-count, with almost double that of the then-best manycore system, the Chinese Sunway TaihuLight.

TOP 500 
After an upgrade, for the 56th TOP500 in November 2020,

From the 52nd list (November 2018) to the 53rd list (June 2019), the Xeon Platinum-based Frontera is the only new top-10 supercomputer, then 5th fastest and the upgraded POWER9-based Lassen moved from 11th to 10th. Sequoia became the last Blue Gene/Q model to drop completely off the list; it had been ranked 10th on the 52nd list (and 1st on the June 2012, 41st list, after an upgrade).

, the new number one supercomputer, Frontier, is also the number 2 system on the Green500 list with the number one system on the Green 500 being the test system for Frontier. The top 4 systems on the June 2022 Green 500 list are systems that use both AMD CPUs and AMD accelerators. Microsoft is back on the list with five Microsoft Azure instances (that use Ubuntu, so all the supercomputers are still Linux-based), with CPUs and GPUs from same vendors, the fastest one was previously ranked 10th. And Amazon with one AWS instance previously ranked 40th. The number of ARM-based supercomputers is up to 6, all but one based on the same Fujitsu CPU as in the number 2 system, with the next one previously ranked 13th, now 20th.

As of June 2022, AMD has 5 systems on the top 10 with IBM having 2 systems along Fujitsu, Intel, and Sunway each having one system on the top 10. The June 2022 list is also the first time that an AMD designed accelerator makes it on to the top 10, where in previous lists Nvidia was the primary accelerator maker if the supercomputer had accelerators.

Legend:
 RankPosition within the TOP500 ranking. In the TOP500 list table, the computers are ordered first by their Rmax value. In the case of equal performances (Rmax value) for different computers, the order is by Rpeak. For sites that have the same computer, the order is by memory size and then alphabetically.
 RmaxThe highest score measured using the LINPACK benchmarks suite. This is the number that is used to rank the computers. Measured in quadrillions of 64-bit floating point operations per second, i.e., petaFLOPS.
 RpeakThis is the theoretical peak performance of the system. Computed in petaFLOPS.
 NameSome supercomputers are unique, at least on its location, and are thus named by their owner.
 ModelThe computing platform as it is marketed.
 ProcessorThe instruction set architecture or processor microarchitecture, alongside GPU and accelerators when available.
 InterconnectThe interconnect between computing nodes. InfiniBand is most used  (38%) by performance share, while Gigabit Ethernet is most used (54%) by number of computers.
 ManufacturerThe manufacturer of the platform and hardware.
 SiteThe name of the facility operating the supercomputer.
 CountryThe country in which the computer is located.
 YearThe year of installation or last major update.
 Operating systemThe operating system that the computer uses.

Other rankings

Top countries 
Numbers below represent the number of computers in the TOP500 that are in each of the listed countries or territories. As of 2022, China has the most supercomputers on the list, with 162 machines. The United States has the highest aggregate computational power at 2,024 Petaflops Rmax with Japan second (595 Pflop/s) and China third (490 Pflop/s).

Fastest supercomputer in TOP500 by country 
(As of June 2022)

Systems ranked  

 HPE Cray Frontier (Oak Ridge National Laboratory , June 2022Present)
 Supercomputer Fugaku (Riken Center for Computational Science , June 2020June 2022)
 IBM Summit (Oak Ridge National Laboratory , June 2018June 2020)
 NRCPC Sunway TaihuLight (National Supercomputing Center in Wuxi , June 2016November 2017)
 NUDT Tianhe-2A (National Supercomputing Center of Guangzhou , June 2013June 2016)
 Cray Titan (Oak Ridge National Laboratory , November 2012June 2013)
 IBM Sequoia Blue Gene/Q (Lawrence Livermore National Laboratory , June 2012November 2012)
 Fujitsu K computer (Riken Advanced Institute for Computational Science , June 2011June 2012)
 NUDT Tianhe-1A (National Supercomputing Center of Tianjin , November 2010June 2011)
 Cray Jaguar (Oak Ridge National Laboratory , November 2009November 2010)
 IBM Roadrunner (Los Alamos National Laboratory , June 2008November 2009)
 IBM Blue Gene/L (Lawrence Livermore National Laboratory , November 2004June 2008)
 NEC Earth Simulator (Earth Simulator Center , June 2002November 2004)
 IBM ASCI White (Lawrence Livermore National Laboratory , November 2000June 2002)
 Intel ASCI Red (Sandia National Laboratories , June 1997November 2000)
 Hitachi CP-PACS (University of Tsukuba , November 1996June 1997)
 Hitachi SR2201 (University of Tokyo , June 1996November 1996)
 Fujitsu Numerical Wind Tunnel (National Aerospace Laboratory of Japan , November 1994June 1996)
 Intel Paragon XP/S140 (Sandia National Laboratories , June 1994November 1994)
 Fujitsu Numerical Wind Tunnel (National Aerospace Laboratory of Japan , November 1993June 1994)
 TMC CM-5 (Los Alamos National Laboratory , June 1993November 1993)

Additional statistics 
By number of systems :

Note: All operating systems of the TOP500 systems are Linux-family based, but Linux above is generic Linux.

Sunway TaihuLight is the system with the most CPU cores (10,649,600). Tianhe-2 has the most GPU/accelerator cores (4,554,752). Fugaku is the system with the greatest power consumption with 29,900 kilowatts.

New developments in supercomputing 
In November 2014, it was announced that the United States was developing two new supercomputers to exceed China's Tianhe-2 in its place as world's fastest supercomputer.  The two computers, Sierra and Summit, will each exceed Tianhe-2's 55 peak petaflops.  Summit, the more powerful of the two, will deliver 150–300 peak petaflops. On 10 April 2015, US government agencies banned selling chips, from Nvidia to supercomputing centers in China as "acting contrary to the national security ... interests of the United States"; and Intel Corporation from providing Xeon chips to China due to their use, according to the US, in researching nuclear weaponsresearch to which US export control law bans US companies from contributing"The Department of Commerce refused, saying it was concerned about nuclear research being done with the machine."

On 29 July 2015, President Obama signed an executive order creating a National Strategic Computing Initiative calling for the accelerated development of an exascale (1000 petaflop) system and funding research into post-semiconductor computing.

In June 2016, Japanese firm Fujitsu announced at the International Supercomputing Conference that its future exascale supercomputer will feature processors of its own design that implement the ARMv8 architecture. The Flagship2020 program, by Fujitsu for RIKEN plans to break the exaflops barrier by 2020 through the Fugaku supercomputer, (and "it looks like China and France have a chance to do so and that the United States is contentfor the moment at leastto wait until 2023 to break through the exaflops barrier.") These processors will also implement extensions to the ARMv8 architecture equivalent to HPC-ACE2 that Fujitsu is developing with Arm.

In June 2016, Sunway TaihuLight became the No. 1 system with 93 petaflop/s (PFLOP/s) on the Linpack benchmark.

In November 2016, Piz Daint was upgraded, moving it from 8th to 3rd, leaving the US with no systems under the TOP3 for only the 2nd time ever.

Inspur has been one of the largest HPC system manufacturer based out of Jinan, China. , Inspur has become the third manufacturer to have manufactured 64-way systema record which has been previously mastered by IBM and HP. The company has registered over $10B in revenues and have successfully provided a number of HPC systems to countries outside China such as Sudan, Zimbabwe, Saudi Arabia, Venezuela. Inspur was also a major technology partner behind both the supercomputers from China, namely Tianhe-2 and Taihu which lead the top 2 positions of TOP500 supercomputer list up to November 2017. Inspur and Supermicro released a few platforms aimed at HPC using GPU such as SR-AI and AGX-2 in May 2017.

In November 2017, for the second time in a row there were no system from the USA under the TOP3.  #1 and #2 were installed in China, a system in Switzerland at #3, and a new system in Japan was #4 pushing the top US system to #5.

In June 2018, Summit, an IBM-built system at the Oak Ridge National Laboratory (ORNL) in Tennessee, USA, took the #1 spot with a performance of 122.3 petaflop/s (PFLOP/s), and Sierra, a very similar system at the Lawrence Livermore National Laboratory, CA, USA took #3. These two system took also the first two spots on the HPCG benchmark. Due to Summit and Sierra, the USA took back the lead as consumer of HPC performance with 38.2% of the overall installed performance while China was second with 29.1% of the overall installed performance. For the first time ever, the leading HPC manufacturer is not a US company. Lenovo took the lead with 23.8% of systems installed. It is followed by HPE with 15.8%, Inspur with 13.6%, Cray with 11.2%, and Sugon with 11%.

On 18 March 2019, the United States Department of Energy and Intel announced the first exaFLOP supercomputer would be operational at Argonne National Laboratory by the end of 2021. The computer, named Aurora, is to be delivered to Argonne by Intel and Cray.

On 7 May 2019, The U.S. Department of Energy announced a contract with Cray to build the "Frontier" supercomputer at Oak Ridge National Laboratory.  Frontier is anticipated to be operational in 2021 and, with a performance of greater than 1.5 exaflops, should then be the world's most powerful computer.

Since June 2019, all TOP500 systems deliver a petaflop or more on the High Performance Linpack (HPL) benchmark, with the entry level to the list now at 1.022 petaflops.

In May 2022, the Frontier supercomputer broke the exascale barrier, completing more than a quintillion calculations per second. Frontier clocked in at approximately 1.1 exaflops, beating out the previous record-holder, Fugaku.

Large machines not on the list 
Some major systems are not on the list. A proiminent example is the NCSA's Blue Waters which publicly announced the decision not to participate in the list because they do not feel it accurately indicates the ability of any system to do useful work. Other organizations decide not to list systems for security and/or commercial competitiveness reasons. One such example is the National Supercomputing Center at Qingdao's OceanLight supercomputer, completed in March 2021, which was submitted for, and won, the Gordon Bell Prize. The computer is an exaflop computer, but was not submitted to the TOP500 list; the first exaflop machine submitted to the TOP500 list was Frontier. Analysts suspected that the reason the NSCQ did not submit what would otherwise have been the world's first exascale supercomputer was to avoid inflaming political sentiments and fears within the United States, in the context of the United States – China trade war. Additional purpose-built machines that are not capable or do not run the benchmark were not included, such as RIKEN MDGRAPE-3 and MDGRAPE-4. A Google Tensor Processing Unit v4 pod is capable of 1.1 exaflops of peak performance, however these units are highly specialized to run machine learning workloads and the TOP500 measures a specific benchmark algorithm using a specific numeric precision.

Computers and architectures that have dropped off the list 
IBM Roadrunner is no longer on the list (nor is any other using the Cell coprocessor, or PowerXCell).

Although Itanium-based systems reached second rank in 2004, none now remain.

Similarly (non-SIMD-style) vector processors (NEC-based such as the Earth simulator that was fastest in 2002) have also fallen off the list.  Also the Sun Starfire computers that occupied many spots in the past now no longer appear.

The last non-Linux computers on the list the two AIX ones running on POWER7 (in July 2017 ranked 494th and 495th originally 86th and 85th), dropped off the list in November 2017.

See also 

 Computer science
 Computing
 Graph500
 Green500
 HPC Challenge Benchmark
 Instructions per second
 LINPACK benchmarks
 List of fastest computers

References

External links 
 
 LINPACK benchmarks at TOP500

 
Supercomputer benchmarks
Supercomputer sites
Top lists